Hazuregyra is a genus of sea snails, marine gastropod mollusks in the family Solariellidae.

Species
Species within the genus Hazuregyra include:
 Hazuregyra watanabei Shikama, 1962

References

 
 S. Williams: description of  Hazuregyra

External links
 To World Register of Marine Species

 
Monotypic gastropod genera
Solariellidae